Nikolay Krastev (born 6 December 1996) is a Bulgarian professional footballer who plays as a goalkeeper for Bulgarian First League club Slavia Sofia.

Career
Krastev made his professional debut in a 0-2 league loss from Pomorie on 27 February 2016.
He made his league debut for Levski against Dunav during the 2016–17 Bulgarian First League, on 28 February 2017. Levski drew 2-2 and Krastev played full 90 minutes on the pitch. 6 days later he became man of the match in the Eternal derby of Bulgarian football against CSKA Sofia, won by Levski with 2-1.

On 4 May 2017 his contract was extended with 3 years, keeping him in the team until 31 July 2020.

In August 2017, Krastev was loaned to Second League club Botev Vratsa. In January 2018, he was called back to Levski's first team. In June 2018, Krastev was loaned again to newly promoted Botev Vratsa. In February 2022, Krastev signed a two-and-half-year contract with Slavia Sofia.

International career
On 17 March 2017 he received his first call up for Bulgaria's U21 team, but on 21 March 2017 he joined Bulgaria's senior team for the match against Netherlands after the injury of Vladislav Stoyanov, during which he remained on the bench.

Career statistics

Club

References

External links
 
 Profile at LevskiSofia.info

1996 births
Living people
People from Dupnitsa
Bulgarian footballers
Bulgaria youth international footballers
Bulgaria under-21 international footballers
PFC Levski Sofia players
PFC Nesebar players
FC Botev Vratsa players
FC Vitosha Bistritsa players
PFC Slavia Sofia players
Association football goalkeepers
First Professional Football League (Bulgaria) players
Second Professional Football League (Bulgaria) players
Sportspeople from Kyustendil Province